Embata is a genus of rotifers belonging to the family Philodinidae.

Species:

Embata commensalis 
Embata hamata 
Embata laticeps 
Embata laticornis 
Embata parasitica

References

Rotifers